"Y, ¿Si Fuera Ella?" is a song recorded by the Spanish singer-songwriter Alejandro Sanz. The song serves as the lead single for Sanz's fourth studio album, Más (1997). It was released for digital download on September 1, 1997.

Chart performance

Cover versions
In 2008, South Korean boy band Shinee released a cover version, a solo sung by member Kim Jonghyun, of this song in Korean, on their album The Shinee World.

In 2017, the song was covered by Pablo Alborán, David Bisbal, Antonio Carmona, Manuel Carrasco, Jesse & Joy, Juanes, Pablo López, Malú, Vanesa Martín, India Martínez, Antonio Orozco, Niña Pastori, Laura Pausini, Abel Pintos, Rozalén, Shakira & Tommy Torres.

In 2019, Super Junior member Kyuhyun sang Jonghyun's version of the song as his 5th and final defense stage for the King title on the MBC show King Of Masked Singer, as a dedication to the latter with whom he was close friends.

References

1997 songs
1997 singles
1990s ballads
Spanish-language songs
Alejandro Sanz songs
Songs written by Alejandro Sanz